Veppanapalli is a town in the Krishnagiri district of Tamil Nadu, India.

Religious Places

Church

 God's Grace Church, it's a oldest, famous  and Spiritual Church located in Veppanapalli. Founder and President Rev.P.T.Abraham and Pastor Gideon Smith  ( Here Amazing Worship, Manifestation of God's presence, Wonderful Message and Life Reformation. )

Temples 
 Ramar Kovil, Veppanapalli, is the temple oldest and famous, located in Budimutlu near the Govt Girls Higher Secondary School.
 Sri Nagareswara Temple located in Budimutlu near the Veppanapalli.
 Pachaimalai Murugan Temple, Veppanapalli to Berigai Road, Karakuppam.
 Vinayagar Temple, near Pachaimalai Murugan Temple, Karakuppam.
 Omshakthi Temple, near Pachaimalai Murugan Temple, Karakuppam
 Panjamuga Anjineyar Kovil, Veppanapalli
 Saneesvarar Kovil, Veppanapalli
 Mariyamman Kovil, Jedukothur
 Basaveswaran Temple, Avalnatham
 Basaveswara Temple, Gollapalli
 Basaveswara Temple, Berigai main road, near Theertham, Podur.
 Sri Anjanaya Temple, Jedukothur, Nachikuppam Panchayat, Krishnagiri Dt
 Sri Badrakaaliyamman Temple, Sigaramaagaanapalli, near Veppanapalli
Shri Raja Rajeshwari Sametha Chandra Mouleshwara Swamy Temple,Gounder Street,Veppanapalli.

Mosques 
Jamia Masjid, Veppanapalli.
Madina Masjid, bus stand, Veppanapalli
Ghousiya Masjid, near register office, Veppanapalli
Qhuba Masjid, Veppanapalli
Suhail Masjid, PGB Petrol Bunk, Veppanapalli

Schools 
 Government Girls Higher Secondary School Veppanapalli 
 Government Boys Higher Secondary School Veppanapalli
 Manavaranapalli Govt Higher Secondary School, Manavaranapalli  
 Vailankani Matric Higher Secondary School, Veppanapalli  
 Shri Maruthi Matric Higher Secondary School, V. Madepalli  
 Sri Sathya Sai Higher Secondary School, Kundarapalli
 Sri Saraswathi Matric Higher Secondary School Ideal Academy (CBSE), Kundharapalli
 Boys High School, Veppanapalli  
 Girls High School, Veppanapalli
 Elementary school, Veppanapalli

References
   
 

Revenue blocks of Krishnagiri district